The 2014–15 season will be the 111th year of Beşiktaş J.K. and their 57th consecutive year in the Süper Lig.

Stadium 
Atatürk Olympic Stadium is the homeground for Beşiktaş J.K. right now, but the club's new stadium might be their new homeground this season. Its capacity is 41.903 and it seems like it will be finished in the second half.

Squad

Competitions

Süper Lig

League table

Matches

Turkish Cup

After finishing in the top four of the previous season's Süper Lig, Beşiktaş qualified for the group stages. Beşiktaş was placed in Group F, along with Adana Demirspor, Çaykur Rizespor and Sarıyer. Beşiktaş finished second.

Group stage

Round of 16

UEFA Champions League

Third qualifying round

Play-off round

UEFA Europa League

Group stage

Knockout phase

Round of 32

Round of 16

References

Turkish football clubs 2014–15 season
Beşiktaş J.K. seasons